The  are a Japanese women's softball team based in Kitakyushu, Fukuoka. The Water Wave compete in the Japan Diamond Softball League (JD.League) as a member of the league's West Division.

History 
The Water Wave were founded in 1969, as Toshiba Kitakyushu (a factory of Toshiba) softball team. The team was transferred to Takagi in 2017.

The Japan Diamond Softball League (JD.League) was founded in 2022, and the Water Wave became part of the new league as a member of the West Division.

Roster

References

External links 
 
 Takagi Kitakyushu Water Wave - JD.League
 
 

Japan Diamond Softball League
Women's softball teams in Japan
Sports teams in Fukuoka Prefecture